Microvirga flocculans  is a bacterium from the genus of Microvirga which has been isolated from water from a hot spring in the Gunma Prefecture in Japan.

References

Further reading

External links
Type strain of Microvirga flocculans at BacDive -  the Bacterial Diversity Metadatabase

Hyphomicrobiales
Bacteria described in 2010